This is a list of mayors of Victoria, the capital city of the Canadian province of British Columbia. The mayor leads Victoria City Council, the city's governing body, and is elected to a four-year term. The current mayor is Marianne Alto, who was first elected in 2022

List of Mayors

See also 

 Victoria City Council

References
Victoria Mayors Listed By Date from the city of Victoria archives

Victoria, British Columbia
List